Life Is Killing Me is the sixth studio album by gothic metal band Type O Negative. It was released on June 17, 2003, and was their final studio album released through record label Roadrunner Records.

The album's title and content refers primarily to frontman Peter Steele's dissatisfied life outlook and experiences with mental illness at the time of writing and production, with lyrics concerning relationship problems and the illness and death of his parents.

The album reached No. 39 on the US Billboard 200 chart, selling 27,000 copies in its first week, and received positive reviews from music critics, who noted a more melodic sound in comparison to previous records. "I Don't Wanna Be Me" was released as a promotional single, for which a music video was produced.

Recording 

Life Is Killing Me was recorded at Systems Two Recording Studio in Brooklyn, New York.

Vocalist and bassist Peter Steele used a custom Fernandes Tremor bass guitar for the recording of the album, an instrument which was built to his exact specifications under his sponsorship with the company.

This is the last album by the band to make use of programmed drums, which had previously been used on October Rust and World Coming Down; the band's next and final studio album, Dead Again, would feature only studio drums.

Content 

Describing the inspiration behind the title and theme of the record, Steele responded in an interview: "I guess I am going through some sort of midlife crisis being 41 years old now. And all the things I took for granted, my health, my life, people I love dying, people I loved walking away. I was with a girlfriend for 10 years but she left. It is like my dreams are dead." The album's title was originally going to be The Dream Is Dead.

The album contains a cover of the song "Angry Inch" from the off-Broadway musical Hedwig and the Angry Inch. The track "Thir13teen" is a cover of music featured in the TV show The Munsters.

Lyrical themes 

Billboard described the record's lyrical themes as "infidelity, death and depression".

"Todd's Ship Gods (Above All Things)" was written by Steele about his father.

"I Like Goils" is described by Steele as "poking fun at PC" (political correctness), with lyrics centred on Steele's frustration with having homosexual men make sexual advances towards him following his 1995 Playgirl photoshoot, which, at the time, Steele agreed to pose for unaware that women made up only a minority of the readership.

The album's title track further references Steele's father's death, while "Nettie" was written about his mother.

Musical style 

AllMusic wrote "guitarist Kenny Hickey's passages have grown increasingly melodic, and the keys of Josh Silver possess a timeless melancholy" despite "how bleak or odd the lyrical proceedings get". Loudwire described it as "the most uplifting sounding album of their career".

Release

Life Is Killing Me was leaked onto the internet before release, upsetting keyboard player Josh Silver to the point that he released a message online complaining that the leak essentially took revenue from the band. The album was officially released on June 17, 2003, on CD as well as cassette in some regions. In Europe, the album was also released with a bonus CD.

The album reached No. 39 on the US Billboard 200 chart.

The album was favorably received by music critics. Exclaim! wrote "Life Is Killing Me pays tongue-in-cheek homage to the world and the women that have screwed Steele over so badly. But musically, the disc is pure pop-rock bliss."

"(We Were) Electrocute" was featured on the soundtrack to the 2003 horror film Freddy vs. Jason.

Legacy 

"I Don't Wanna Be Me" was covered by European death metal band Meridian Dawn for their debut 2014 release The Mixtape. The song was later covered by Trivium.

The opening two seconds of guitar feedback and drum startup on "I Don't Wanna Be Me" is sampled and heard frequently on the Liberty Rock Radio station in the video game Grand Theft Auto IV.

Track listing

Credits 
Type O Negative

Peter Steele – lead vocals, bass guitar, additional electric guitar and keyboards
Kenny Hickey – backing vocals, co-lead vocals (on "...A Dish Best Served Coldly", "How Could She?" and "Angry Inch"), electric guitar
Josh Silver – backing vocals, keyboards, sound effects, drum programming
Johnny Kelly – backing vocals, drums, percussion

Additional personnel

 The Bensonhoist Lesbian Choir (actually the band members themselves) – backing vocals
 Paul Bento – sitar (on "Less Than Zero (<0)"), tamboura, drum machine (on "Less Than Zero (<0)", "Electrocute (We Were)" and "Anesthesia"), lead guitar (on "How Could She?")
 Pandit Kinnar K. Seen – tabla (on "Less Than Zero (<0)")
 Sal Abruscato – backing vocals (on "I Like Goils")

Technical personnel

 Mike Marciano – engineering, mixing
 George Marino – mastering
 Rebecca Waterfall – sleeve design
 Daniel Moss – sleeve photography

Charts

References

External links 

 

Type O Negative albums
2003 albums
Roadrunner Records albums